Miller Place (originally Miller's Place) was a station on the Wading River Extension on the Port Jefferson Branch of the Long Island Rail Road. The station was just east of Sylvan Avenue just north of New York State Route 25A, along what is now access for Long Island Power Authority power lines.

History
Miller Place station was originally built in 1898 during the extension of the Port Jefferson Branch to Wading River, which was once slated to continue eastward and rejoin the Main Line at either Riverhead or Calverton. The station was located on the north side of the tracks to the east of Sylvan Avenue. The first station house opened in 1898 and was destroyed by a fire in September 1903. The station house was replaced but it was also destroyed by a fire in September 1934.

The extension of the Long Island Rail Road to Miller Place near the turn of the century turned the town into a popular summer resort with hotels and summer cottages overlooking Long Island Sound. The importance of the town as a vacation destination declined with the advent of automobile travel and ridership along the Wading River Branch decreased. The line east of Port Jefferson, which included the Miller Place station, was abandoned in 1938. The right-of-way is now owned by the Long Island Power Authority and used for power lines, but there are plans to create a rail trail for bicycling, running, and walking.

References

External links
Wading River Extension (Unofficial LIRR History.com)
Wading River Branch (Arrt's Arrchives)
Site of the former Miller Place Long Island Rail Road station (Road and Rail Pictures)
Trains Are Fun.com:
Wading River Extension
Bob Emery Map of Miller Place Station & Vicinity

Former Long Island Rail Road stations in Suffolk County, New York
Railway stations in the United States opened in 1898
Railway stations closed in 1938
1898 establishments in New York (state)
1938 disestablishments in New York (state)